Androsace, commonly known as rock jasmine, is a genus of flowering plants in the  family Primulaceae, second only to Primula in the number of species. It is predominantly Arctic–alpine, with many species in the Himalayas (where the genus originated), the mountains of central Asia, the Caucasus, and the southern and central European mountain systems, particularly the Alps and the Pyrenees.

Plants of this genus are sometimes known as rock jasmines or fairy candelabras, and are widely cultivated for their dense cushions covered in white or pink flowers. There are roughly 110 species.

These plants have small entire or toothed leaves which form a basal rosette.

Taxonomy
Recent molecular studies show that the genera Douglasia (found in north-western North America and easternmost Siberia), Pomatosace (an Himalayan endemic) and Vitaliana (a European endemic) are nested within Androsace. Phylogenetic studies have also demonstrated that the ancestor of Androsace first appeared about 35 Mya ago and was most probably an annual species. Evolution towards the denser morphology of cushions took place two times independently in Asia and in Europe.

Species
, Plants of the World Online recognizes the following 166 species, including those formerly placed in Douglasia and Vitaliana.
Androsace adenocephala Hand.-Mazz.
Androsace adfinis Biroli
Androsace aflatunensis Ovcz.
Androsace aizoon Duby
Androsace akbaitalensis Derganc ex O.Fedtsch.
Androsace alaica Ovcz. & S.B.Astan.
Androsace alaschanica Maxim.
Androsace alaskana Coville & Standl. ex Hultén
Androsace albana Steven
Androsace alchemilloides Franch.
Androsace alpina (L.) Lam.
Androsace americana Wendelbo
Androsace apus Franch. ex R.Knuth
Androsace × aretioides (Gaudin) Hegetschw.
Androsace argentea (C.F.Gaertn.) Lapeyr.
Androsace armeniaca Duby
Androsace axillaris (Franch.) Franch.
Androsace baltistanica Y.J.Nasir
Androsace beringensis (S.Kelso, Jurtzev & D.F.Murray) Cubey
Androsace bidentata K.Koch
 
Androsace bisulca Bureau & Franch.
Androsace brachystegia Hand.-Mazz.
Androsace brevis (Hegetschw.) Ces.
Androsace bryomorpha Lipsky
Androsace bulleyana Forrest
Androsace bungeana Schischk. & Bobrov
Androsace caduca Ovcz.
Androsace caespitosa Lehm. ex Spreng.
Androsace cernuiflora Y.C.Yang & R.F.Huang
Androsace chaixii Gren. & Godr.
Androsace chamaejasme Wulfen
Androsace ciliata DC.
Androsace ciliifolia Ludlow
Androsace constancei Wendelbo
Androsace coronata (Watt) Hand.-Mazz.
Androsace cortusifolia Nakai
Androsace croftii Watt
Androsace cuscutiformis Franch.
Androsace cuttingii C.E.C.Fisch.
Androsace cylindrica DC.
Androsace darvasica Ovcz.
Androsace dasyphylla Bunge
Androsace delavayi Franch.
Androsace dielsiana R.Knuth
Androsace dissecta (Franch.) Franch.
Androsace diversifolia C.Y.Wu
Androsace duthieana R.Knuth
Androsace elatior Pax & K.Hoffm.
Androsace elongata L.
Androsace engleri R.Knuth
Androsace erecta Maxim.
Androsace eritrichioides Gand.
Androsace × escheri Brügger
Androsace euryantha Hand.-Mazz.
Androsace exscapa Maximova
Androsace fedtschenkoi Ovcz.
Androsace filiformis Retz.
Androsace flavescens Maxim.
Androsace foliosa Duby
Androsace forrestiana Hand.-Mazz.
Androsace gagnepainiana Hand.-Mazz.
Androsace geraniifolia Watt
Androsace globifera Duby
Androsace globiferoides (Kunth) Hand.-Mazz.
Androsace gmelinii (L.) Roem. & Schult.
Androsace gorodkovii Ovcz. & Karav.
Androsace graceae Forrest ex W.W.Sm.
Androsace gracilis Hand.-Mazz.
Androsace graminifolia C.E.C.Fisch.
Androsace halleri L.
Androsace handel-mazzettii Kress
Androsace harrissii Duthie
Androsace hausmannii Leyb.
Androsace hazarica R.R.Stewart ex Y.J.Nasir
Androsace hedreantha Griseb.
Androsace × heeri W.D.J.Koch
Androsace helvetica (L.) All.
Androsace hemisphaerica Ludlow
Androsace henryi Oliv.
Androsace hohxilensis R.F.Huang & S.K.Wu
Androsace hookeriana Klatt
Androsace hopeiensis Nakai
Androsace × hybrida A.Kern.
Androsace idahoensis (Douglass M.Hend.) Cubey
Androsace incana Lam.
Androsace integra (Maxim.) Hand.-Mazz.
Androsace intermedia Ledeb.
Androsace jacquemontii Duby
Androsace khokhrjakovii Mazurenko
Androsace khumbuensis Dentant
Androsace komovensis Schönsw. & Schneew.
Androsace kouytchensis Bonati
Androsace kuczerovii Knjaz.
Androsace kuvajevii Mazurenko
Androsace lactea L.
Androsace lactiflora Fisch. ex Willd.
Androsace laevigata (A.Gray) Wendelbo
Androsace laggeri A.Huet
Androsace lanuginosa Wall.
Androsace laxa C.M.Hu & Y.C.Yang
Androsace lehmanniana Spreng.
Androsace lehmannii Wall. ex Duby
Androsace limprichtii Pax & K.Hoffm.
Androsace longifolia Turcz.
Androsace lowariensis Y.J.Nasir
Androsace ludlowiana Hand.-Mazz.
Androsace mairei H.Lév.
Androsace × marpensis G.F.Sm.
Androsace mathildae Levier
Androsace maxima L.
Androsace medifissa Y.L.Chen & Y.C.Yang
Androsace minor (Hand.-Mazz.) C.M.Hu & Y.C.Yang
Androsace mirabilis Franch.
Androsace mollis Hand.-Mazz.
Androsace montana (A.Gray) Wendelbo
Androsace mucronifolia Watt
Androsace multiscapa Duby
Androsace muscoidea Duby
Androsace nivalis (Lindl.) Wendelbo
Androsace nortonii Ludlow
Androsace obtusifolia All.
Androsace occidentalis Pursh
Androsace ochotensis Roem. & Schult.
Androsace ojhorensis Y.J.Nasir
Androsace ovalifolia Y.C.Yang
Androsace ovczinnikovii Schischk. & Bobrov
Androsace pavlovskii Ovcz.
Androsace paxiana R.Knuth
Androsace × pedemontana Rchb.
Androsace phaeoblephara Hand.-Mazz.
Androsace podlechii Wendelbo
Androsace poissonii R.Knuth
Androsace pomeiensis C.M.Hu & Y.C.Yang
Androsace pubescens DC.
Androsace pyrenaica Lam.
Androsace refracta Hand.-Mazz.
Androsace rhizomatosa Hand.-Mazz.
Androsace rigida Hand.-Mazz.
Androsace rioxana A.Segura
Androsace rockii W.E.Evans
Androsace rotundifolia Hardw.
Androsace runcinata Hand.-Mazz.
Androsace russellii Y.J.Nasir
Androsace sajanensis Stepanov
Androsace salasii Kurtz
Androsace sarmentosa Wall.
Androsace selago Hook.f. & Thomson ex Klatt
Androsace sempervivoides Jacquem. ex Duby
Androsace septentrionalis L.
Androsace sericea Ovcz.
Androsace sessiliflora Turrill
Androsace similis Craib
Androsace spinulifera (Franch.) R.Knuth
Androsace squarrosula Maxim.
Androsace staintonii Y.J.Nasir
Androsace stenophylla (Petitm.) Hand.-Mazz.
Androsace strigillosa Franch.
Androsace sublanata Hand.-Mazz.
Androsace sutchuenensis Franch.
Androsace tanggulashanensis Y.C.Yang & R.F.Huang
Androsace tapete Maxim.
Androsace tibetica (Maxim.) R.Knuth
Androsace tonkinensis Bonati
Androsace tribracteata R.F.Huang
Androsace triflora Adams
Androsace umbellata (Lour.) Merr.
Androsace vegae R.Knuth
Androsace villosa L.
Androsace vitaliana (L.) Lapeyr.
Androsace wardii W.W.Sm.
Androsace wilsoniana Hand.-Mazz.
Androsace wulfeniana (Sieber ex W.D.J.Koch) Rchb.
Androsace yargongensis Petitm.
Androsace zambalensis (Petitm.) Hand.-Mazz.
Androsace zayulensis Hand.-Mazz.

Former Douglasia species
The online Flora of North America placed nine species in Douglasia that are now included in Androsace (names in Androsace from Plants of the World Online):
 
Douglasia arctica = Androsace americana
Douglasia alaskana = Androsace alaskana
Douglasia beringensis = Androsace beringensis
Douglasia gormanii = Androsace constancei
Douglasia idahoensis = Androsace idahoensis
Douglasia laevigata = Androsace laevigata
Douglasia montana = Androsace montana
Douglasia nivalis = Androsace nivalis
Douglasia ochotensis = Androsace ochotensis

New species described in 2021 
A group of scientist disentangled the morphology and ecology of Androsace genius in the French Alps and described three new species in 2021:

 Androsace vesulensis in the A. alpina group, endemic of the Mont Viso.
 Androsace saussurei and A. delphinensis in the A. pubescens group, which grow on siliceous substrate and are endemic to Mont Blanc and Central Alps respectively.

Cultivation
The following species have gained the Royal Horticultural Society’s Award of Garden Merit. All are mat-forming evergreen perennials.
A. lanuginosa (woolly rock jasmine) - lilac pink
A. sempervivoides (sempervivum-leaved rock jasmine) - mauve pink
A. studiosorum (rock jasmine) - deep pink

References

External links
Flora of Pakistan
The Androsace Group
Androsace Photo Gallery

 
Alpine flora
Primulaceae genera